Microfibrillar-associated protein 1 is a protein that in humans is encoded by the MFAP1 gene.

References

Further reading